Timothy J.  Solobay (born March 20, 1956) is a Pennsylvania politician who served as the Fire Commissioner of Pennsylvania from 2015 to 2017. A Democrat, he previously served as a member of the Pennsylvania State Senate.

Biography
He graduated from the Washington Hospital School of Radiologic Technology (Washington, Pennsylvania) in 1976. He received a B.S. in Radiologic Technology from California University of Pennsylvania in 1984 and a B.S. in Business Management from an online program through the California Coast University in 1990. (California Coast University was not nationally accredited at the time he was taking online classes there; however, it was accredited by the State of California, and gained national distance learning accreditation in 2005.)

Solobay is the chief of the Canonsburg Volunteer Fire Department, and he was formerly a member of the Pennsylvania House of Representatives before his election to the Pennsylvania Senate. He was defeated for re-election to the state senate in 2014 by Republican Camera Bartolotta. He was then named the new State Fire Commissioner by Governor Tom Wolf. He resigned as Pennsylvania Fire Commissioner in late December 2017. Bruce Trego has been appointed as acting commissioner by Gov. Tom Wolf.

References

External links
Pennsylvania Office of the State Fire Commissioner

1956 births
Living people
Democratic Party members of the Pennsylvania House of Representatives
Democratic Party Pennsylvania state senators
People from Canonsburg, Pennsylvania
California Coast University alumni